Bqerzla    is a town in Akkar Governorate, Lebanon.

The population  is  Maronite.

History
In 1838, Eli Smith noted  the place as Mukurzela,  located west of esh-Sheikh Mohammed. The  inhabitants were Maronites.

References

Bibliography

External links
Bqerzla, Localiban 

Populated places in Akkar District
Maronite Christian communities in Lebanon